Timberland may refer to:

Places
 Timberland, Lincolnshire, a village in Lincolnshire, England
 Timberland, Wisconsin, an unincorporated community, US

Other uses
 Timberland, land used for forestry and timber production
 Timberland (company), a manufacturer of outdoor wear and footwear including timber boots
 Timberland (board game), a German board game
 Timberland Regional Library, a public library system in Washington state, US
 Timberland High School (Missouri)
 Timberland High School (South Carolina)

See also

 Timbaland (born 1972), American rapper and record producer
 Timberlake (disambiguation)
 Timberlane (disambiguation)